Jutro idziemy do kina (English: Tomorrow we are going to the movies) is a 2007 Polish Television movie, directed by Michał Kwieciński. It tells a story of three friends, who graduated from high school in May 1938. Two of them joined the army, and the third became a student of medicine. After graduation, they frequently meet each other, and in the summer of 1939, when war becomes imminent, they try not to keep themselves too occupied with it. Outbreak of World War II (see: Polish September Campaign), changes their world forever.

It won Gold Magnolia Award for Best Television Film at the 14th Shanghai Television Festival in China.

Cast 

 Mateusz Damięcki – Andrzej Skowroński
 Antoni Pawlicki – Piotr Dołowy
 Jakub Wesołowski – Jerzy Bolesławski
 Grażyna Szapołowska 
 Olgierd Łukaszewicz
 Sylwia Oksiuta-Warmus 
 Anna Gzyra 
 Julia Pietrucha 
 Maria Niklińska – Basia
 Marta Ścisłowicz – Ania
 Krzysztof Banaszyk 
 Krzysztof Stelmaszyk 
 Katarzyna Gniewkowska 
 Jacek Romanowski 
 Krzysztof Skonieczny – Bzowski
 Adam Krawczyk – Zawada
 Piotr Żurawski – Natan Cymertopf
 Andrzej Szenajch – Generał
 Daniel Olbrychski 
 Grzegorz Łaguna 
 Sebastian Cybulski 
 Monika Jakowczuk
 Magdalena Lamparska – Małgosia
 Karol Stępkowski 
 Zofia Tomaszewska-Charewicz – Rózia
 Jerzy Słonka 
 Michał Rolnicki
 Bożena Adamek

References

External links
 Jutro idziemy do kina at imdb.com

2007 television films
2007 films
Polish drama films
2000s Polish-language films